The canton of Le Port is an administrative division of Réunion, an overseas department and region of France. It was created at the French canton reorganisation which came into effect in March 2015. Its seat is in Le Port.

It consists of the following communes:
Le Port

References

Cantons of Réunion